Cuthy Mede is a Malawian artist.

Early life 
Cuthy Mede was born to Malawian parents in Zimbabwe in 1949. He grew up on Likoma Island in Lake Malawi. Later, he studied Fine Arts at Chancellor College.

Career 
He worked as a lecturer in the 1970s at his alma mater. In the 1980s, Mede established Gallerie Africaine, the first art gallery by a local artist in Malawi. Mede exhibited his work in Lilongwe's City Centre, selling his work to international collectors. 

Mede encouraged the work of young Malawian artists struggling to make a living as street traders selling folk art and wood carvings. He brought fine art work from other Malawian artists into his gallery. One commission was for a large mural decorating the City Centre. 

Mede is best known for his modern art styles: modern, futurist, cubist, and pointillist, with strong local themes. His paintings depict local people, historic and current events in Malawi, Biblical references with local interpretations, indigenous religious expressions, and paintings about concepts such as Justice, Greed, Man and Machine.

References

Further reading

Malawian artists
Living people
Year of birth missing (living people)
University of Malawi alumni
Academic staff of the University of Malawi